The Sergeant Carl F. Curran II Bridge is a girder bridge connecting East Brady and Brady's Bend Township, Pennsylvania. The structure was completed in 2007 to replace a narrow 1885 truss bridge that had been reconstructed twice (in 1953 and 1974). The replacement span was built as part of ongoing improvements to Route 68.

The structure's namesake is a member of the Pennsylvania Army National Guard who was killed in Iraq in 2004. Curran grew up just blocks from the bridge's location.

History
The 2007 bridge replaced a truss bridge built in 1885. The 1885 bridge was demolished at just after 10:00 on June 4, 2007 by Demtech of Dubois, Wyoming. using just under  of RDX.

See also
List of crossings of the Allegheny River

References

Nat'l Bridges article on old structure

Bridges over the Allegheny River
Bridges completed in 2007
Bridges in Armstrong County, Pennsylvania
Road bridges in Pennsylvania
Girder bridges in the United States
2007 establishments in Pennsylvania